WCPI (91.3 FM) is a radio station licensed to Mcminnville, Tennessee, United States.  The station is owned by Warren County Educational Foundation.

References

External links

CPI